Danyelle Nicole Wolf (born September 8, 1983), is an American boxer and mixed martial artist. She is a three-time USA Boxing National Champion in the women’s welterweight division (152 lbs).

Background
She is from York, Pennsylvania. After graduating from Eastern York High School in 2002, she graduated from Millersville University of Pennsylvania where she was a three-sport athlete in basketball, track (heptathlon), and field hockey.

Amateur boxing career
Wolf started training boxing in 2008 and took her first amateur fights in 2010. In 2011, she first attended Olympic trials but her weight class was not added to Olympic boxing in 2012 Summer Olympics. She then went on to win US National Boxing Championships in three consecutive years (2013–2015). In 2015, Wolf again attended Olympic trials and as her weight class was not added to 2016 Summer Olympics either, she transitioned to mixed martial arts.

As the women's welterweight division was added to 2020 Summer Olympics, Wolf returned to the sport to try out for the Olympics. However, she was eliminated from the Olympic trials and returned to mixed martial arts.

Mixed martial arts career

Dana White's Contender Series 
Danyelle made her MMA debut at Dana White's Contender Series 33 on September 15 against Taneisha Tennant. She won the fight via unanimous decision.

Ultimate Fighting Championship
Wolf was scheduled  to face Felicia Spencer on May 22, 2021 at UFC Fight Night 188. However, Wolf pulled out of the fight in early May due to an undisclosed injury and was replaced by Norma Dumont.

Wolf made her promotional debut against  Norma Dumont on September 10, 2022, at UFC 279. She lost the fight by unanimous decision.

Wolf is scheduled to face Chelsea Chandler on April 29, 2023 at UFC Fight Night 223.

Mixed martial arts record

|Loss
|align=center| 1–1
|Norma Dumont
|Decision (unanimous)
|UFC 279
|
|align=center|3
|align=center|5:00
|Las Vegas, Nevada, United States
|
|-
|Win
|align=center| 1–0
|Taneisha Tennant
|Decision (unanimous)
|Dana White's Contender Series 33
|
|align=center|3
|align=center|5:00
|Las Vegas, Nevada, United States
|
|-

See also
 List of female mixed martial artists
 List of current UFC fighters

References

External links

1983 births
Living people
Welterweight boxers
American women boxers
American female mixed martial artists
Featherweight mixed martial artists
Mixed martial artists utilizing boxing
Sportspeople from York, Pennsylvania
Millersville University of Pennsylvania alumni
21st-century American women